The Burnelli GX-3, also known as Uppercu-Burnelli UB-SS. was an American twin-engined, mid-wing experimental aircraft which first flew in 1929. Work commenced on this aircraft during development of the Burnelli CB-16. Soon after, Daniel Guggenheim announced the Guggenheim Safe Aircraft Competition. Many manufacturers brought aircraft to this competition. The GX-3 was built in New Jersey, but did not arrive at the competition in time to participate. However, it was reported to have good short take-off and landing capabilities and was able to operate at 200 km/h. The GX-3 had wings which were able to change their shape using flaps. The front wheels were smaller than the rear ones, and the aircraft was powered by two  engines. The pilots sat in an open cockpit. The aircraft also incorporated Burnelli's lifting-body feature.

Specifications

References

Levy, Howard and Richard Riding. "Burnelli's Lifting Fuselages". Aeroplane Monthly. April 1980, S. 173f.

1920s United States experimental aircraft
Lifting bodies
GX-3
Mid-wing aircraft
Twin piston-engined tractor aircraft
Aircraft first flown in 1929